Goweroconcha waterhousiae, also known as the cinnamon-zigzag pinwheel snail, is a species of air-breathing land snail, a terrestrial pulmonate gastropod mollusc in the pinwheel snail family, that is endemic to Australia's Lord Howe Island in the Tasman Sea.

Description
The shell of the snail is 3.3–4.2 mm in height, with a diameter of 7.4–8.1 mm. The colour is dark reddish-brown with zigzagging cream flammulations (flame-like markings). The shape is discoidal with a flat to slightly sunken spire, rounded whorls, impressed sutures, and with moderately closely-spaced radial ribs. The umbilicus is widely open. The aperture is roundly lunate with a flattened upper edge. The animal is cream to pale grey, with a pink head, dark grey to black eyestalks, and with two dark bands along the neck.

Distribution and habitat
The snail is common and widespread in the lowlands of the island, where it is found in moist woodland and rainforest, in plant litter beneath logs and fallen palm fronds.

References

 
 

 
waterhousiae
Gastropods of Lord Howe Island
Taxa named by Charles Hedley
Gastropods described in 1897